Wutach is a rural municipality on the northern edge of the district of Waldshut in Baden-Württemberg in Germany.  It has a combined administration with the neighbouring town of Bonndorf.  There is no settlement as such called Wutach: the municipality includes the villages of Ewattingen (c. 800 inhabitants), Münchingen (c. 300) and Lembach (c. 200).  Most of the municipality's facilities (e.g. council offices, and primary school) are in Ewattingen.

Wutach lies to the south of the Wutach Gorge, through which the river Wutach flows.

References

Towns in Baden-Württemberg
Waldshut (district)
Baden